Amiruddin bin Yusop is a Malaysian politician and former served as Deputy of Malacca State Executive Councillor.

Election results

Honours
  :
  Companion Class I of the Order of Malacca (DMSM) – Datuk (2013)

References

United Malays National Organisation politicians
Malaysian people of Malay descent
Malaysian Muslims
Members of the Malacca State Legislative Assembly
Malacca state executive councillors
21st-century Malaysian politicians
Living people
Year of birth missing (living people)